Triplophysa aliensis is a species of stone loach in the genus Triplophysa endemic to Tibet. It grows to  SL. Its name refers to Ali, Tibet, its type locality.

References

A
Freshwater fish of China
Endemic fauna of Tibet
Taxa named by Wu Yun-Fei
Taxa named by Zhu Song-Quan
Fish described in 1979